LaRue, Larue or La Rue is a surname of French origin and less frequently a given name. 

LaRue, Larue or La Rue may also refer to:

Places in the United States
 Larue, Arkansas, an unincorporated community
 La Rue, Illinois, an unincorporated community
 LaRue County, Kentucky
 LaRue, Ohio, a village
 LaRue, Texas, an unincorporated community
 La Rue, Wisconsin, an unincorporated community

Music
 LaRue (band), a Christian rock duo
 LaRue (LaRue album), the duo's first studio album, released in 2000

See also
 La Roux, a British electropop synth band
 De La Rue, an English company
 Delarue (disambiguation)